Samantha Taylor (born Myroslava Lastivka Lydia Luciw in Toronto in 1958) is a Canadian radio and television personality. She is perhaps best known as the host of the popular CBC Television music video program Video Hits from 1984 to 1989.

Bio

Early life
Born to Ukrainian parents in Toronto, Taylor's family moved to Pennsylvania when she was three years old. She began her broadcasting career while a student at Pennsylvania State University, using her birthname Myra Luciw as host of the  Ukrainian students' radio  program on the university radio station while also using the pseudonym Michele Michaels at a commercial station she was an intern.

After graduation, Taylor worked briefly in Washington, DC before returning to Toronto in 1980, where she was hired as station librarian and part-time disc jockey for Q-107. At Q-107 she rose to become the station's music director. During that same period she also began hosting CFMT's Metro Music show, giving her the music video experience that would lead to the eventual job with CBC's Video Hits in 1984. On Metro Music she typically introduced the videos and then answered phone calls live on air from fans in the Toronto area. While later working for the CBC, Taylor also judged some episodes of the network's 1985 battle of the bands competition series Rock Wars.

Video Hits success
In an era in which many viewers across Canada, particularly in non-urban areas, didn't have access to cable television programming such as MTV and MuchMusic, Video Hits quickly became the best bet for many viewers to see the latest hit music videos. As the show's popularity grew, Taylor came to be regarded as "Canada's coolest young lady". At its peak, the show attracted one million viewers weekly and drew higher ratings than any other music video program in Canada.

References

 Smith, Diane "Taylor Made for TV" Toronto Star, April 12, 1986

External links
 
 1985 clip of Samantha Taylor on Video Hits
  Bociurkiw, Mykhailo "Samantha Taylor:  An Interview with Canada's No. 1 V. J." (pp. 9, 14) Interview with Taylor about her life and career, her ethnic roots, and about the music industry at a time when music videos were a new art form.

1958 births
Living people
People from Toronto
Donald P. Bellisario College of Communications alumni
Canadian VJs (media personalities)
Canadian people of Ukrainian descent